Alex Pettit is an American public administration official who is currently Chief Technology Officer for the State of Colorado Governor's Office of Information Technology. Pettit was formerly the chief information officer for the State of Oregon. As State CIO, Pettit worked in the Department of Administrative Services and was responsible for all information and telecommunication systems for all state agencies.  In March 2014, Pettit was appointed interim CIO for Cover Oregon, the agency responsible for the implementation of the Health Care Exchange in compliance of the Affordable Care Act.  Previously, Pettit was the first CIO for the State of Oklahoma, serving from April 2010 until January 2014.

Pettit was appointed to his position by Governor John Kitzhaber on January 6, 2014.

Biography
Pettit earned his bachelor's degree from the University of Wisconsin–Parkside and received a Master of Business Administration from Loyola University of Chicago. In 2014, he completed his Ph.D. in Interdisciplinary Information Sciences from the University of North Texas.  Pettit is a member of the Beta Gamma Sigma International Honor Society.

Pettit began his public career in 1998 in Denton, Texas as the first Chief Technology Officer for the city.  He served in this capacity until October 2008.  He then worked for Marsh McLennan in the areas of business continuity planning strategy and vision, disaster recovery and business resumption planning. He served in that position until 2009 when he became a consultant for Brown University where he served as project manager for planning and coordination of Brown's data center.

In 2010, Governor of Oklahoma Brad Henry appointed Pettit as the State's first Chief Information Officer. As State CIO, Pettit served as a member of the Oklahoma Governor's Cabinet and received an annual salary of $160,000. On January 6, 2011, Governor-elect Mary Fallin announced that she would retain Pettit as State CIO.  Pettit left the State of Oklahoma in January, 2014 to assume the position of CIO for the State of Oregon.  On April 6, 2018 Pettit resigned his position as the State of Oregon CIO.  He served in the administration of Governor Kate Brown.

References

External links
Gov. Henry names Pettit new CIO, Office of Governor Henry, 3-26-10
Henry names Texas name to fill new Chief Information officer post, Daily Oklahoman, 3-27-10
Governor-elect Mary Fallin to Retain Alex Pettit As Chief Information Officer, Office of Governor Fallin, 1-06-11
 Oklahoma CIO Alex Pettit accepts Oregon CIO position
 Oregon Health Exchange CIO is soon to be Ore-gone
State CIO Alex Pettit biography, National Association of State Chief Information Officers
State biography of State CIO Alex Pettit, Oklahoma Office of State Finance
Oklahoma CIO tapped to lead Oregon IT work
Oregon Chief Information Officer Alex Pettit Announces Resignation, Office of Governor Brown, 4-06-18

People from Denton, Texas
Living people
University of Wisconsin–Parkside alumni
1966 births
People from Oregon
Chief information officers
American chief technology officers